The 2013 Toyota/Save Mart 350 was a NASCAR Sprint Cup Series stock car race held on June 23, 2013, at Sonoma Raceway in Sonoma, California, United States. Contested over 110 laps on the 1.99-mile (3.2 km) road course, it was the sixteenth race of the 2013 Sprint Cup Series championship, and the first of two road course competitions on the schedule. Martin Truex Jr. of Michael Waltrip Racing won the race, breaking a 218-race winless streak stretching back to June 2007, while Jeff Gordon finished second. Carl Edwards, Kurt Busch, and Clint Bowyer rounded out the top five. The top rookie of the race was Ricky Stenhouse Jr. who finished 27th.

Report

Background

Sonoma Raceway is one of two road courses to hold NASCAR races, the other being Watkins Glen International. The Chute was only used for NASCAR events such as this race, and was criticized by many drivers, who preferred the full layout. Clint Bowyer was the defending race winner after winning the race in 2012.

Seven teams chose to temporarily replace their regular drivers with road course ringers. Humphrey Smith Racing chose Alex Kennedy to drive the No. 19 Toyota, while Circle Sport chose Ron Fellows to drive their No. 33 Chevrolet. Tommy Baldwin Racing (TBR) selected Victor Gonzalez Jr. to drive the No. 36 Chevrolet, making Gonzalez Jr. the first Caribbean driver to race in the Sprint Cup Series. TBR also chose Justin Marks to drive the No. 7. Brian Keselowski chose Drive for Diversity graduate Paulie Harraka to drive the No. 52 Ford, while NEMCO-Jay Robinson Racing selected Tomy Drissi to drive their No. 87 car, replacing Joe Nemechek. Boris Said competed during the race in the No. 32 FAS Lane Racing Ford. Jacques Villeneuve, the 1995 Indianapolis 500 winner and 1997 Formula One World Champion, was selected by Phoenix Racing to drive the No. 51 as well. Jason Bowles was tabbed by Michael Waltrip Racing to pilot the No. 55 in place of Brian Vickers in practice and qualifying due to Vickers participating in the Johnsonville Sausage 200 at Road America.

Before the race, Jimmie Johnson was leading the Drivers' Championship with 538 points, while Carl Edwards stood in second with 507 points. Bowyer followed in the third with 489, thirteen points ahead of Kevin Harvick and thirty-three ahead of Matt Kenseth in fourth and fifth. Kyle Busch, with 452, was in sixth; five ahead of Dale Earnhardt Jr., who was scored seventh. Eighth-placed Greg Biffle was thirteen points ahead of Brad Keselowski and twenty-six ahead of Tony Stewart in ninth and tenth. Paul Menard was eleventh with 415, while Kasey Kahne completed the first twelve positions with 407 points. In the Manufacturers' Championship, Chevrolet was leading with 107 points, fifteen points ahead of Toyota. Ford was third after recording only 79 points before the race.

For the first time, Amtrak ran a special train from Sacramento to the race on trackage that had never seen a passenger train. The train was run using Capitol Corridor equipment. 500 fans total rode the train.

Practice and qualifying

Two practice sessions were held on June 21 in preparation for the race. The first session was 105 minutes, while second session was 90 minutes long.

During the first practice session, Marcos Ambrose, for the Richard Petty Motorsports team, was quickest ahead of Juan Pablo Montoya in second and Casey Mears in third. Kurt Busch was scored fourth, and Jamie McMurray managed fifth. Biffle, Keselowski, Bowyer, Martin Truex Jr., and Joey Logano rounded out the top ten quickest drivers in the session. In the final practice session for the race, Bowyer was quickest with a time of 75.765 seconds. McMurray followed in second, ahead of Kyle Busch and Edwards in third and fourth. Montoya, who was second quickest in second practice, could only manage fifth.

Starting with this race, NASCAR changed qualifying procedures for Sprint Cup races held on the road courses. Rather than having one car attempt to qualify at a time, groups of either five or six cars were released in five-second intervals and had a five-minute time limit to complete their runs. He was joined on the front row of the grid by Ambrose. Edwards qualified third, Biffle took fourth, and Bowyer started fifth. Kenseth, Kurt Busch, Logano, Kyle Busch, and Jeff Gordon completed the first ten positions on the grid.

Qualifying order
Source:

Group 1

Group 2

Group 3

Group 4

Group 5

Group 6

Group 7

Group 8

Results

Qualifying

Race results

Notes

 Points include 3 Chase for the Sprint Cup points for winning, 1 point for leading a lap, and 1 point for most laps led.

Standings after the race

Drivers' Championship standings

Manufacturers' Championship standings

Note: Only the first twelve positions are included for the driver standings.

References

Toyota Save Mart 350
Toyota Save Mart 350
Toyota Save Mart 350
NASCAR races at Sonoma Raceway